Konstantinos Loudis (born 24 March 1969) was a Greek water polo player who competed in the 1992 Summer Olympics, the 1996 Summer Olympics, the 2000 Summer Olympics, and the 2004 Summer Olympics.

See also
 Greece men's Olympic water polo team records and statistics
 List of players who have appeared in multiple men's Olympic water polo tournaments

References

External links
 

1969 births
Living people
Greek male water polo players
Greek water polo coaches
Olympiacos Water Polo Club players
Olympic water polo players of Greece
Panathinaikos Water Polo Club coaches
Panathinaikos Water Polo Club players
Water polo players at the 1992 Summer Olympics
Water polo players at the 1996 Summer Olympics
Water polo players at the 2000 Summer Olympics
Water polo players at the 2004 Summer Olympics
Water polo players from Thessaloniki
20th-century Greek people
21st-century Greek people